SAS: Red Notice (also known as SAS: Rise of the Black Swan) is a 2021 British action thriller film directed by Magnus Martens, based on the novel of the same name by Andy McNab and starring Sam Heughan, Ruby Rose, Andy Serkis, Hannah John-Kamen, Tom Hopper, Noel Clarke, Owain Yeoman, Ray Panthaki, Anne Reid and Tom Wilkinson. Sky Cinema released SAS: Red Notice in the United Kingdom on 12 March 2021.

Plot
Black Swans is a family-owned private military company led by American citizens William Lewis and his adult children Grace and Oliver. SAS commander George Clements hires them to clear a remote village in Georgia for a transnational Britgaz gas pipeline. When the village resists, Black Swans massacre them. Their atrocities are secretly filmed, leading to red notices and accusations of crimes against humanity. The International Criminal Court demands that the UK extradite the accused, who live in North London, to the Hague to stand trial. Prime Minister Atwood secretly orders Clements to kill William on the scene instead of arresting to cover up his involvement.

SAS operator Tom Buckingham, who was involved in serving the red notice, takes his girlfriend, Dr. Sophie Hart, on a romantic train journey from London to Paris where he intends to propose to her. Sophie is unsure whether they understand each other properly, whereas Tom is unsure whether he truly loves her. The remnants led by Grace Lewis hijack their train while it is en route in the Channel Tunnel, taking all of the passengers on board hostage at gunpoint. Using his military skills, Tom escapes from the train and evades capture. When he attempts to rescue Sophie, she refuses to leave the other passengers, who may need medical assistance, and asks him to save a young girl.

Tom regularly updates his position and sends intelligence to Declan Smith, a member of the SAS Counter Insurgency Team and his friend. Declan, who has been bribed by the Black Swans, sends a rescue team into a trap. Grace asks for a $500 million ransom from Britgaz or else she will blow up the tunnel and reveal the secret Britgaz Gas Pipeline in the tunnel. After inviting Clements to negotiate, Grace records their conversation. Grace finds out via Declan that Tom's girlfriend is on the train and takes her hostage. Tom returns to the train but fails to save Sophie. Grace escapes with her through the gas pipeline, pursued by Tom. Grace's team uploads the video of Clements and tries to escape among the hostages, but SAS snipers kill them. Upon not finding Grace among the hostages, Clements realises that Declan is guilty.

Once out of the pipe, Grace blows up the pipeline, and Tom narrowly escapes. Clements and all of the SAS operatives appear to be killed in the explosion excluding Declan. Grace stabs Sophie on her thigh and runs away. Sophie says she finally understands Tom and asks him to catch Grace instead of being with her. After catching up with Grace and killing her, Tom realises that he loves Sophie. During their trip, Tom proposes to Sophie. She refuses at first, believing him incapable of love, but agrees after seeing his emotional reaction. The UK PM and Britgaz representative are questioned, and all blame is transferred to Declan, the sole surviving member of Grace's team. Tom and Sophie get married in Spain, during which Tom is briefed by his superior, Clements, who survived the explosion, to find Declan.

Cast

Production
It was announced in November 2018 that filming had begun in Budapest on the film. Filming continued to February 2019, including London and Paris.

Release
Sky Cinema released the film on 12 March 2021. In February 2021, Vertical Entertainment and Redbox Entertainment acquired U.S. distribution rights to the film and set it for a 16 March 2021 release.

Warner Bros. Home Entertainment released SAS: Red Notice on DVD and Blu-ray under Universal Pictures Home Entertainment on 12 July 2021. The film was retitled SAS: Rise of the Black Swan on Netflix to avoid confusion with the Netflix-produced film Red Notice, which was also released in 2021.

Reception
According to the review aggregator website Rotten Tomatoes, 52% of critics have given the film a positive review based on 21 reviews; the average rating is 5.10/10.  The critics consensus reads: "Whether it's called SAS: Red Notice or SAS: Rise of the Black Swan, this is a thoroughly mediocre action thriller."

References

External links
 

2021 films
2021 action thriller films
British action thriller films
Films about hostage takings
Films about the Special Air Service
Films about terrorism in Europe
Films based on thriller novels
Films shot in Budapest
Films shot in London
Films shot in Paris
2020s English-language films
2020s British films